Smetanino is a rural locality (a village) and the administrative center of Verkhovskoye Rural Settlement, Verkhovazhsky District, Vologda Oblast, Russia. The population was 524 as of 2002. There are 17 streets.

Geography 
Smetanino is located 28 km southwest of Verkhovazhye (the district's administrative centre) by road. Kiselevo is the nearest rural locality.

References 

Rural localities in Verkhovazhsky District